Jaina seven-valued logic is system of argumentation developed by Jaina philosophers and thinkers in ancient India to support and substantiate their theory of pluralism. This argumentation system has  seven distinct  semantic predicates which may be thought of as seven different truth values. Traditionally, in the Jaina and other Indian literature dealing with topics in Jain philosophy, this system of argumentation is referred to as Saptabhangivada or Syadvada.  The earliest reference to Syadvada occurs is the writings of Bhadrabahu (c. 433–357 BCE). There is mention of Syadvada in the Nyayavatara of Siddhasena Divakara (about 480–550 CE). Samantabhadra (about 600 CE) gave a full exposition of the seven parts of Syadvada or Saptabhanginyaya in his Aptamimamsa. The Syadvadamanjari of Mallisena (1292 CE) is a separate treatise on the same theory. There are, of course, still later works and  a large number of  modern commentaries. The interpretation of Saptabhangivada as a seven-valued logic was attempted by Harvard University philosophy professor George Bosworth Burch (1902–1973) in a paper published in International Philosophical Quarterly in the year 1964. P. C. Mahalanobis, an Indian applied statistician, has given a probabilistic interpretation of the Saptabhangivada.

The seven predicates
The Saptabhangivada, the seven predicate theory may be summarized  as follows:

The seven predicate theory consists in the use of seven claims about sentences, each preceded by "arguably" or "conditionally", concerning a single object and its particular properties, composed of assertions and denials, either simultaneously or successively, and without contradiction. These seven claims are the following.

 Arguably, it (that is, some object) exists. 
 Arguably, it does not exist. 
 Arguably, it exists; arguably, it doesn't exist. 
 Arguably, it is non-assertible. 
 Arguably, it exists; arguably, it is non-assertible. 
 Arguably, it doesn't exist; arguably, it is non-assertible. 
 Arguably, it exists; arguably, it doesn't exist; arguably it is non-assertible.

There are three basic truth values, namely, true (t), false (f) and unassertible (u). These are combined to produce four more truth values, namely, tf, tu, fu, and tfu (Three-valued logic). Though, superficially, it appears that there are only three distinct truth values a deeper analysis of the Jaina system reveals that the seven truth values are indeed distinct. This is a consequence of the conditionalising operator "arguably" denoted in Sanskrit by the word . This Sanskrit word has the literal meaning of "perhaps it is", and it is used to mean "from a certain standpoint" or "within a particular philosophical perspective".

In this discussion the term "standpoint" has been used in a technical sense. Consider a situation in which a globally inconsistent set of propositions, the totality of philosophical discourse, is divided into sub-sets, each of which is internally consistent. Any proposition might be supported by others from within the same sub-set. At the same time, the negation of that proposition might occur in a distinct, though possibly overlapping subset, and be supported by other propositions within it. Each such consistent sub-set of a globally inconsistent discourse, is what the Jainas call a "standpoint" (naya). A standpoint corresponds to a particular philosophical perspective.

In this terminology, it can be seen that the seven predicates get translated to the following seven possibilities. Each proposition p has the following seven states:

 p is a member of every standpoint in S.
 Not-p is a member of every standpoint in S.
 p is a member of some standpoints, and Not-p is a member of the rest.
 p is a member of some standpoints, the rest being neutral.
 Not-p is a member of some standpoints, the rest being neutral.
 p is neutral with respect to every standpoint.
 p is a member of some standpoints and Not-p is a member of some other standpoints, and the rest are neutral.

Comparison with Catuskoti and Aristotelian Logic 

Negation of logical value

Further reading
For the implementation of a generic computational argumentation system to Jaina seven-valued logic, see 
For an exposition of the Jaina concept of logic, see 
For an exposition stating that Saptabhangi cannot be considered as logic in the modern sense of the word, see 
For an exposition of Saptabhangi, see 
For a discussion on Syadvada, see  (Sankhya 18, 195–200, 1957)
Marie-Hélène Gorisse, Nicolas Clerbout and  developed a dialogical approach to the theory of standpoints.

References

Many-valued logic
History of logic
Jain philosophical concepts